Blood Cultures is an American experimental indie pop group from New Jersey. First known as a single person and now recognized as a collective (a quartet as of 2019), the band's members remain anonymous, their faces obscured by black hoods in all photos. As they have explained, their anonymity is crucial to their ethos and aims "to keep the relationship between the listener and the music as pure as possible". Hailed as some of the most exciting music coming out of New York by NME in 2018, Blood Cultures' genre-bending sound is often characterized as psychedelic pop, electropop, and chillwave. Blood Cultures released their first album, Happy Birthday, in 2017. The band released its second album, Oh Uncertainty! A Universe Despairs, in September 2019. Their third record, LUNO, was released on May 28, 2021.

History

2013–17: First singles and Happy Birthday
Blood Cultures released their debut single, "Indian Summer", in October 2013, by uploading it to Soundcloud. The project was launched with conspicuously little background info; at the time, it had no social media accounts or biography and was only represented by a photograph of an individual with a black hood. The first single was followed by "Mercury Child" and "Meavy Hetal", in February and April 2014, respectively. The single "Scenes from a Midnight Movie" was released in September 2015 with what would eventually be revealed as the artwork for the group's debut album, Happy Birthday, which was in turn released in July 2017 and accompanied by some of their first interviews. Blood Cultures made their first performance at Rough Trade in August 2017 to celebrate the release, and went on to perform with acts such as Princess Nokia and Yumi Zouma throughout the year.

2018–19: Oh Uncertainty! A Universe Despairs and first tour
Blood Cultures released a single and video for "Dunk on Me" on Halloween 2018, the first material from their sophomore album. This was followed by "Flowers for All Occasions" in March 2019, a single inspired by the hijacking of local New Jersey TV stations in the early 1990s. With the release of the single "Best for You" in June 2019, Blood Cultures announced their album Oh Uncertainty! A Universe Despairs, set for publication that September. The single was accompanied by a manifesto conveying Blood Cultures' convictions to remain anonymous, explaining that "disclosing our personalities, politics, alignments, intentions, orientations, etc., could detach the listener further from the personal connection that they have made with the music" and urging that "art is not what the artist intends it to be but rather what you make of it". Following the release of an additional single, "No Favors", in August, the band issued their twelve-track album in September 2019. In interviews, Blood Cultures described the album as "a conversation between two opposing sides that share a single relationship" and "a personal journey of self-discovery". The album was generally reviewed positively as "a bright and beautiful blend of cultures, wandering vocals, and electronic beats" and "one of 2019's greatest experiences". In November, Blood Cultures released a video for the album's song "Broadcasting", which commented on the question of identity for those who feel pulled between two cultures. The band promoted the album with their first US headline tour in late 2019.

2021–present: LUNO
On January 28, 2021, Blood Cultures made their comeback with a new single, entitled "Keeps Bringing Me Back", from their upcoming project, LUNO. On February 25, 2021, they released a new single, entitled "Beneath the Moon & Me". The third single came out on March 29, 2021, and was titled "Set It on Fire". The fourth single from the upcoming album, "When the Night Calls..." was released on April 27, 2021.LUNO came out on May 28, 2021.

Musical style
The elements that comprise Blood Cultures' sound include psychedelic textures, bedroom pop beats, and tropical melodies. Indicative of their experimental approach, their arrangements have been characterized by "warm, lo-fi guitars; wobbling synths; washed-out percussion; and auto-tuned, cut-and-paste vocals", "drenched in maximum reverb". Though they hesitate to discuss their influences, Blood Cultures have been likened to LCD Soundsystem, Toro Y Moi, and Jai Paul.

Discography

Albums

Singles

References

External links
 

Experimental pop musicians
American experimental musical groups
Psychedelic pop music groups
Masked musicians
Musical groups established in 2013
2013 establishments in New Jersey